The Leigh Matthews Trophy is an annual award given by the AFL Players Association to the Most Valuable Player in the Australian Football League. It is named in honour of Leigh Matthews, who won the first MVP award in 1982, when the league was still known as the Victorian Football League. The trophy was first awarded in 2002, and all previous VFLPA/AFLPA MVPs were retrospectively given the Matthews Trophy in 2005. It is awarded at a special AFL Players Association awards ceremony.

The voting procedure for the award is:
At the end of the regular season, each team votes for three players (previously two) to be considered for election.
Two weeks into the finals, the AFLPA sends a final ballot to all players throughout the league. Players cannot vote for their own teammates; in fact, the ballots sent to each team are redacted to remove that team's nominees. Each player awards three votes to the player he believes is the best in the league, two votes to the second-best, and one vote to the third-best. The leading vote-getter receives the trophy.
Prior to 2011, each player cast a single vote for the award.

The award is roughly analogous to the Brownlow Medal, the traditional "best and fairest" award in the league. However, the voting system is completely different: the Brownlow Medal awards votes on a game-by-game basis, while Leigh Matthews Trophy awards a single vote based on the entire season. In particular, this has meant that key-position players have been more likely to win this award than the Brownlow Medal. For example, Wayne Carey, generally regarded as one of the league's all-time great key-position players, never won the Brownlow Medal, but he won this honour twice.

The Leigh Matthews Trophy is strictly for the most valuable player, not the best and fairest as is the case with the Brownlow Medal. A league disciplinary suspension, which renders a player ineligible for the Brownlow, does not exclude a player from contention for the Matthews Trophy. In 1996, Corey McKernan finished tied in the Brownlow voting with that season's winners James Hird and Michael Voss, but he was disqualified from the Brownlow because of a disciplinary suspension. However, McKernan won the AFLPA MVP award that season.

Winners

Multiple winners
The following players have won the Leigh Matthews Trophy multiple times.

See also
Athlete of the Year

References

External links
AFL Players’ MVP - AFL Players Association website

Australian Football League awards
Australian rules football awards
Most valuable player awards
Awards established in 1982
1982 establishments in Australia